Government of Zhang Xun was formed after the Qing dynasty was restored on 1 July 1917 by General Zhang Xun. Puyi, who abdicated in 1912, became Qing emperor again. The government survived for 13 days only after army of the Republic of China forced Puyi to give up his throne. Puyi accepted Zhang's resignation on that day, the government was hence dissolved.

Composition 
The following is a list of ministers in the cabinet:

References 

Government of the Qing dynasty
Cabinets established in 1917
Cabinets disestablished in 1917